Dua Stanislas Ankira Ntsonakoulou (born 4 December 1994) is a Congolese professional footballer who plays as a defensive midfielder for I-League club Sreenidi Deccan.

Club career
On 5 January 2023, Dua Ankira moved to India and signed with I-League side Sreenidi Deccan on a season-long deal.

International career
In January 2014, coach Claude Leroy, invited him to be a part of the Congo squad for the 2014 African Nations Championship. The team was eliminated in the group stages after losing to Ghana, drawing with Libya and defeating Ethiopia.

References

1994 births
Living people
Republic of the Congo footballers
2014 African Nations Championship players
Republic of the Congo A' international footballers
CSMD Diables Noirs players
Association football midfielders